Line 21 of the Guangzhou Metro is a rapid transit rail line in Guangzhou.

Line 21 is an express suburban metro line along with Line 14. Both lines were envisioned to connect and promote development in the northeast regions of Guangzhou. Line 21's unique role means that it has many design features that make it different from other Guangzhou metro lines. These considerations allow for passengers to travel from outer Guangzhou to the city center in one hour. Line 21 runs from Yuancun in Tianhe to Zengcheng Square in Zengcheng. The line has a total of 21 stations, of which 18 are underground and 3 are elevated.

The eastern section of Line 21 opened on 28 December 2018 and the western section opened on 20 December 2019.

Opening timeline

Train service
There are 2 types of train services offered on the metro line 21:

  —  (Local services, stop at every stations on mainline)
  —  (Rapid express services, only stop at Yuancun, Tianhe Park, Tangdong, Huangcun, Tianhe Smart City, Shenzhoulu, Suyuan, Zhenlong, Fenggang, Zengcheng Square)

Stations
 L - local services
 R - rapid express services

Footnotes

References

21
Railway lines opened in 2018